Dimitri Petrov may refer to:
 Dimitri Petrov (cross-country skier)
 Dimitri Petrov (artist)

See also
 Dmitry Petrov (disambiguation)